Saturday Mash-Up! is a British Saturday morning children's magazine entertainment programme on CBBC and BBC Two, first broadcast on 30 September 2017. It is currently presented by Joe Tasker and a puppet monster called Stanley performed by Dave Chapman.

History
It is CBBC's first series in this genre since TMi moved to Fridays in 2010. It is said to "continue the tradition of iconic Saturday morning programmes such as Live & Kicking, Going Live!, Saturday Superstore, Dick & Dom in da Bungalow and Multi-Coloured Swap Shop".

A second series aired from 29 September 2018 on CBBC. A third series started on 1 February 2020.  However, due to the 2019–2020 Coronavirus pandemic, the show was presented from Tasker, Kaur, and Chapman's houses via video-link under the name Saturday Mash-Up! House Party, from 4 April until the end of the series on 30 May. The 3rd series resumed on 7 November to broadcast the remaining episodes in the series.

A new series began on 23 January 2021 although it is still listed as series 3.

Spin-off series Summer Mash-Up aired during the 2020 summer holidays in a 30-minute Thursday afternoon slot (temporarily replacing Blue Peter). In 2018 and 2019, special programmes were also produced as part of the CBBC Summer Social TV coverage. Every week, the series broadcasts live from BBC Pacific Quay Studios, in Glasgow. The show includes celebrity guests, games, sketches and CBBC shows, and focuses on live chat with children across the United Kingdom, either on the phone or via the web. The show originally aired until 11am but was expanded to 11:30am in Series 3. In the Christmas 2020 episode Part 1 aired from 9am-9:30am with a 45 minute break at 09:30 due to 2 Christmas specials on CBBC and CBeebies. Guests picked what they were going to watch and the 2nd part began at 10:15 and ended at 12:15. It is also the first time a Saturday morning Kids Show has ran into the afternoon since 1993

Up until the COVID-19 pandemic, the show was filmed in front of a studio audience who are children. When the show resumed production after quarantine, to follow the health guidelines, the episodes were filmed without the kid audience, and all celebrity guests practiced social distancing.

As of 2022, the show brought back its kid audience in future episodes, with the current COVID-19 vaccine available to all under the age of 5.

On 10 and 17 September 2022 the show was off air due to the UK national period of mourning for the death of Queen Elizabeth II.

Segments

How Many Things in the Thing?
A number of an object (for example, footballs) are placed into another object (for example, a phonebox). Viewers at home on the phone must guess what number of an object is in the other object.

Make Me Viral
Viewers are asked to send in a picture of themselves doing something different each week (for example, throwing away their homework).

Britain's Silliest Face
Viewers are asked to pull silly faces and send in pictures. Joe and Harpz then rate them out of five.

Mash-Up Monarch
Each week, a viewer watching at home is chosen to make various decisions. These include choosing what episode of a programme to show and choosing who does a task like tidying up the studio or eating a gross item.

Push Off
Two celebrities must push a shopping trolley into a pyramid of 800 toilet rolls to see how many they can collect. Each toilet roll is worth a point, with the golden toilet roll being worth 10 points and the brown toilet roll causing them to lose 5 points. They can choose between 3 trollies, which change each week. While the crew count the rolls, Johnny Nelson played a game with the contestant called "Jonny's random supermarket item pricing game while we count the toilet rolls". This was changed for later series and replaced with "How Much?" and "Whose Shop?", both led by Joe Tasker. The celebrity loser is then asked to pie themself.

Stars Behind Bars
A celebrity is 'locked up in jail' and answers as many questions they can in 100 seconds.

Detention Seekers
A/two celebrity/s is put in detention and has to answer questions about themselves until the school bell rings. On one occasion, instead of a celebrity, Penfold from Danger Mouse was used.

Tongue Twister
Celebrities go head to head in a giant spinning wheel and try to get food down a throat hole. Large food items are thrown in, including mystery superfoods with plus or minus points written on. After running in the wheel for thirty seconds, celebs are taken to Joe's relaxation area and asked to "Say Ahhhh" while the points are added up. After some dentist themed jokes, the scores are announced and the celebrities are added to the leader board.

End of Show

Gunging

Series 1 
For the final segment of the program, the viewers watching the show vote on who they want to be covered with gunge, from a selection of two, three or four options. In the first show, Steve Backshall was chosen. In series 1, the celebrity voted was gunged in a "gunging ceremony" with the help of the other guests that appeared in the program.

Series 2 onwards 
As of Series 2, viewers' chosen celebrity had to answer questions in the space of ninety seconds and can avoid being covered with slime by answering the question correctly. If they answer incorrectly, they have a bucket of slime poured over them. At the end of the ninety seconds, the celebrity must answer a final question, which is always outlandish and nearly impossible to answer correctly. If answered incorrectly, the celebrity is slimed heavily with multiple buckets (Commonly known as "Super Slime"). To date, no one has ever answered the final question correctly. However, should the person get the question correctly, the person is rewarded 20 points to their score but gets slimed nevertheless.

In the Christmas episodes, there is no slime vote. All guests get covered in slime and sing a Christmas song. However, in the Christmas 2021 episode, there was no Christmas sliming, instead a person would pull a Christmas Cracker with confetti being released, the three people who have green confetti are automatically safe, while the person with red confetti gets slimed.

From Series 4 onwards, Question Slime was replaced by Slime O'Clock News, where the format was the same, but it had a different layout.

Celebrities who have been gunged/slimed include Steve Backshall, DanTDM, Vick Hope, Kimberly Wyatt, Naomi Wilkinson, Lindsey Russell (twice), New Hope Club, Road Trip, Oti Mabuse, Lewys Ball, Olivia Grace and Lovevie, Colson Smith, Mark Rhodes, Briony Williams, Cat Henstridge, Bella Ramsey, Dani Harmer and Jenny Richardson.

A New slime game started in Series 5 known as Mashtermind.

Final Bits of Show 
When the sliming ceremony has been completed, the hosts give a recap of what will happen next week and bid the viewers farewell and thank the guests for coming. Finally, the theme music plays one more time as the hosts and the guests say goodbye. The show ends and CBBC resumes their programming as usual.

Content

Programmes

Presenters

Segments

Things

References

External links

CBBC shows
BBC children's television shows
2010s British children's television series
2020s British children's television series
2017 British television series debuts
English-language television shows
British television shows featuring puppetry
Television series by BBC Studios
Television series featuring gunge